Platevindex tigrinus is a species of air-breathing sea slug, a shell-less marine pulmonate gastropod mollusk in the family Onchidiidae.

Description 
This species has a light grey hyponotum like Platevindex coriaceus and can hardly be distinguished from that species, except by examining the internal anatomy or genome.

Distribution 
The species occurs in Brunei, India (Andaman Islands, Maharashtra and West Bengal), Peninsular Malaysia, Singapore, and Southern China.

References 

Onchidiidae
Gastropods described in 1869